Mohamed Amer may refer to:

 Mohamed Amer (sport shooter) (born 1969), Egyptian sport shooter
 Mohamed Amer (handballer) (born 1987), Egyptian handball player
 Mohamed Amer (fencer), Egyptian fencer

See also
Mohammed Amer (born 1981), American stand-up comedian and writer